The Wu–Yang monopole was the first solution (found in 1968 by Tai Tsun Wu and Chen Ning Yang) to the Yang–Mills field equations. It describes a magnetic monopole which is pointlike and has a potential which behaves like 1/r everywhere.

See also
Meron
Dyon
Instanton
Wu–Yang dictionary

Notes

References
 Gauge Fields, Classification and Equations of Motion, M.Carmeli, Kh. Huleilil and E. Leibowitz, World Scientific Publishing

Gauge theories
Magnetic monopoles